On this list of U.S. military vessels named after women, there are many ships that have seen service with the United States military. Most of these were named in civilian service and then subsequently commissioned into the United States Navy as combat vessels, or as service vessels with U.S. Military Sealift Command. The earliest ships served in the Continental Navy. Overall, few ships have been named after women by the military. Ships often are named after people who served in the Navy, Marines, Coast Guard, or the government. Women have only recently been in such prominent positions, and therefore few have been so honored by the Navy.

Continental Navy
The schooner  was commissioned in 1775. 
The gunboat  was commissioned in 1776 and was the first American armed ship named for a woman. She was a row galley, a small wooden river gunboat, built in 1776 by New York State to defend Hudson River, named in honor of Martha Washington. She remained active, under General Washington's command, through June 1777.
 , a frigate in the Continental Navy named for Marie Antoinette.

United States Maritime Commission
 , the first ship of the Maritime Commission named for a woman. She was named for Sacagawea in 1942, a Shoshone woman, who served as an interpreter and guide for the Lewis and Clark Expedition. The name was also assigned to a tugboat acquired by Maritime Commission for the Navy. This Sacagawea was retained by Maritime Commission and not commissioned in the Navy.

United States Navy

The following is a list of ships in the United States Navy named after specific women:

The sidewheel steamer Harriet Lane was launched in 1857. She was the first armed ship in service with the U.S. Navy to be named for a woman. Originally a Revenue Cutter, she was named for Harriet Lane, niece of President James Buchanan, who served as Buchanan's White House hostess. 

The sternwheel river steamer  was launched in 1856. This name was retained from a former name, of feminist Amelia Bloomer. Bloomer was captured from Confederates in 1862, but then served in the U.S. Navy from 1863–65.

 , a screw sloop commissioned in 1860 and,
 , a harbor tug commissioned in 1942, both named for famed Native American princess Pocahontas.
 Six transports commissioned in 1942:
 , named for Dorothea Dix, first Superintendent of Army Nurses and mental health care activist.
 , named for suffragist Elizabeth C. Stanton
 , named for Florence Nightingale, founder of modern nursing.
 , named for Mary Lyon, founder of Wheaton and Mount Holyoke Colleges
 , named for suffragist Susan B. Anthony
 USS Anne Arundel (AP-76), named after a county in Maryland, which in turn was named for English noblewoman Lady Anne Arundell. 
 , a harbor tug acquired in 1942, named for the Native American guide on the Lewis and Clark Expedition.
 , a 1944 harbor tug named for a Potawatomi woman, (the Naval Historical Center says the name Watseka is "possibly a variant spelling of Watsaghika, a former village of the Iruwaitsu Shasta Indian tribe of northern California, at the extreme west end of Scott Valley.")
 USS Higbee (DD-806), 1945 a Gearing-class destroyer named for Lenah S. Higbee, Superintendent of Navy Nurse Corps. 
 USS Hopper (DDG-70), an  named for Grace Hopper, a U.S. Navy Rear Admiral and computer technology pioneer who led the Navy into the digital age. 
 , named for both President Franklin Delano Roosevelt and First Lady Eleanor Roosevelt.
 , second ship named for Sacagawea, launched in 2006, she is the second of a new class of replenishment ships.
 , an oceanographic survey ship launched in October 2000, she was named for Commander Mary Sears, a pioneer in oceanography.
 USNS Amelia Earhart (T-AKE-6) is a sister ship of Sacagawea, named for Amelia Earhart, a pioneer in aviation and women's rights activist. 
 , a  named for astronaut Sally Ride launched in 2014.
 Ordered John Lewis-class replenishment oilers:
 USNS Lucy Stone (T-AO-209), named for Lucy Stone, abolitionist and suffragist.
 USNS Sojourner Truth (T-AO-210), named for Sojourner Truth, escaped slave, abolitionist, and suffragist.
 USNS Ruth Bader Ginsburg (T-AO-211), named for Ruth Bader Ginsburg, Associate Justice of the United States Supreme Court.

Other Navy ships with a woman's name
Many of these ships served in one or both of World War I, World War II, and some also during the interwar period. Many were the patrol boats (SP), while others were civilian craft (ID) taken into naval service. Others served in the Stone Fleet, or were prizes during the Age of Sail. The names often came from a previous owner and almost all were commissioned into the Navy. While some were named by the navy, it is not known which.

Alphabetically

USS Annabelle (SP-1206)

USS Annie E. Gallup (SP-694)

USS Betty Jane I (SP-3458)
USS Betty M. II (SP-623)

USS Edithia (SP-214) (later YP-214)

USS Katrina Luckenbach (SP-3020)

USS Reina Mercedes (IX-25)
USS Sara Thompson (SP-3148) (later AO-8)

By designation

ID

SP

USS Edithia (SP-214) (later YP-214)

USS Katrina Luckenbach (SP-3020)

USS Betty M. II (SP-623)

USS Annie E. Gallup (SP-694)

USS Annabelle (SP-1206)

USS Sara Thompson (SP-3148) (later AO-8)
USS Betty Jane I (SP-3458)

Other

 (yacht)
USS Reina Mercedes (IX-25) (experimental)

References 

Women
Women named vessels
Women in the United States military
U.S. military vessels named after women
Military